Tej I Love You is a 2018 Indian Telugu romantic drama film directed by A. Karunakaran and produced by K. S. Rama Rao under Creative Commercials banner. It stars Sai Dharam Tej and Anupama Parameswaran in lead roles.

Plot
Tej as a child goes to prison for killing a person to protect a woman. Serves 7 years in a juvenile home. As a grown up Tej is a singer in crazy boys band. Tej is very attached to his family. He along with his sisters go to home on summer vacation. In home, one of his sister's marriage is fixed within family. But Tej helps his sister to elope with her lover. The family then come to know Tej is the one who helped his sister to elope. All of the family is shocked to know the truth. Some of the family member insults Tej and his dead parents due to which the family is broke. He gets thrown out of the family as he goes against family values by breaking his sisters arranged marriage within family. Moves to live with his so called musician uncle. 

He sees Nandini and loves at first sight. She has come to India to fulfill her Mother's last wish and to find the person who saved her (who is Tej). Nandini and Tej help each other and Nandini falls in love with Tej. When she comes to tell him this, he is writing an exam. So she records "I Love you Tej" in a pen (which they bought together) and gives to the invigilator to give it to him. However, she incurs an accident as soon as she leaves the centre and is unable to tell him her feelings.

Due to an accident Nandini forgets a whole one year of her life, she also forgets Tej. Tej makes it seem like she was just part of the boys band. Nandini s father, who only wanted to know where the property papers that Nandini had taken to India were, comes to India after knowing about the accident. Nandini partially retraces her steps and finds about her enquires. She ultimately finds out that Tej is the person that saved her mother and thanks him; he refuses the property and gives it back to them. At the airport while returning, she finds the invigilator who returns the Pen to her and she finds out that she indeed loved him before and shows the same to him, and they profess their love to one another.

Cast
Sai Dharam Tej as Tej
Anupama Parameswaran as Nandini
Jayaprakash as Tej's uncle
Pavitra Lokesh as Tej's aunt
Anish Kuruvilla as Nandini's father
Surekha Vani as Sudha, Tej's aunt
Prudhvi Raj as Sudha's husband
Viva Harsha as Harsha
Banerjee as Coach Murthy
Bhavana Samanthula as Nandini's Mother
Karthik Adusumalli
Josh Ravi

Soundtrack
The music was composed by Gopi Sundar and released by Aditya Music.

Release
Tej I Love You was released worldwide on 6 July 2018.

Critical Reception
In its review of the film, The Times of India rated the film 2/5 and commented that: "Director Karunakaran made a splash in Tollywood as a love story writer-filmmaker with Tholi Prema. Twenty years later, however, he still seems to be stuck with a 'formula' of cinema that worked in the 1990s. In 2018, all you get is a lifeless love story. As an audience, you want a bit more than that."

123 Telugu rated the film 2.75/5 and considered that: "Tej I Love You is the same old love story which Karunakaran has made many a time in the past. There is nothing new which this film showcases. Bad songs, lack of interesting romance and forced elements sidetrack the film."

Hans India rated the film 2.25/5 and remarked that: "Rather than focusing on the main plot, the makers unnecessarily included a lot of elements in the movie. The first half completely is about the teasing game between the hero and heroine and the second half is all about how hero wins back his love."

Greatandhra rated 2.5/5 and wrote, "is an outdated romantic drama that tests the patience to the maximum. It lacks fresh ideas."

References

External links
 

2018 films
2010s Telugu-language films
Indian romantic drama films
Films scored by Gopi Sundar
2018 romantic drama films
Films shot in Paris